Mainland is an unincorporated community in Lower Salford Township in Montgomery County, Pennsylvania, United States. Mainland is located at the intersection of Mainland Road and Store Road, with Pennsylvania Route 63 bypassing the community to the northeast.

References

Unincorporated communities in Montgomery County, Pennsylvania
Unincorporated communities in Pennsylvania